The 2002 Winchester Council election took place on 2 May 2002 to elect members of Winchester District Council in Hampshire, England.

The whole council was up for election with boundary changes since the last election in 2000. The boundary changes were the first since the 1970s and they saw the number of seats increased by 2.

The results saw the Liberal Democrats stay in overall control of the council after retaining 35 seats on the council. However the Liberal Democrat leader of the council, Rodney Sabine, lost his seat in New Alresfords ward. The Conservatives increased their number of councillors from 11 to 14, while Labour lost 1 to only hold 3 seats. Voter turnout was higher than nationally, with over 50% voting in 4 wards.

Election result

Ward results

Bishops Waltham

Boarhunt & Southwick

Cheriton & Bishops Sutton

Colden Common & Twyford

Compton & Otterbourne

Denmead

Droxford, Soberton & Hambledon

Itchen Valley

Kings Worthy

Littleton & Harestock

Oliver's Battery & Badger Farm

Owslebury & Curdridge

Shedfield

Sparsholt

St Barnabas

St Bartholomew

St John & All Saints

St Luke

St Michael

St Paul

Swanmore & Newton

The Alresfords

Upper Meon Valley

Whiteley

Wickham

Wonston & Micheldever

References

2002
2002 English local elections
2000s in Hampshire